"He's Letting Go" is a song written by Pat Bunch, Pam Rose and Mary Ann Kennedy, and recorded by American country music group Baillie & the Boys.  It was released in August 1987 as the second single from the album Baillie & the Boys.  The song reached #18 on the Billboard Hot Country Singles & Tracks chart.

Chart performance

References

1987 singles
1987 songs
Baillie & the Boys songs
Songs written by Mary Ann Kennedy (American singer)
Songs written by Pam Rose
Song recordings produced by Kyle Lehning
Songs written by Pat Bunch
RCA Records singles